is a Japanese competitive swimmer who specializes in breaststroke events. She won the gold medal in the 200 meter breaststroke at the 2016 Summer Olympics.

Career
She represented her nation Japan, as a 19-year-old junior, at the 2008 Summer Olympics and has won a career total of four medals in a major international competition, spanning two editions of the Summer Universiade (2007 and 2009), the Short Course Worlds, and the  Pan Pacific Championships. Apart from her Olympic career, Kaneto also demolished both a Japanese and Asian record of 2:20.72 at the Japan University Championships in Kumamoto. Kaneto is a physical education graduate at Tokai University in Hiroshima.

Rie made her international swimming debut at the 2007 Summer Universiade in Bangkok, Thailand, quickly claiming a silver medal in the 200 m breaststroke by less than 0.04 of a second behind South Korea's Jung Seul-ki in 2:25.63. Rie's best effort at these Games vaulted her up to twelfth in the world rankings.

Rie earned her first selection to the Japanese team to compete in the women's 200 m breaststroke at the 2008 Summer Olympics in Beijing. Leading up to the Games, she placed second behind Megumi Taneda at the Olympic trials in Tokyo with a FINA A-standard entry time of 2:26.28. Kaneto touched out Taneda to take the seventh spot in the final by nine hundredths of a second (0.09), in an outstanding time of 2:25.14.

At the 2009 Summer Universiade in Belgrade, Serbia, Rie set an Asian and Japanese mark of 2:22.32 to claim the 200 m breaststroke title, just a single hundredth margin off her record from the national championships (2:22.33).

In 2010, Rie surprisingly missed out the podium in the 200 m breaststroke at the Asian Games in Guangzhou, China, when she placed fourth behind two Chinese swimmers and new champion Jeong Da-rae of South Korea in 2:25.63.

In March 2018 Rie retired from competitive swimming.

References

External links
 

1988 births
Living people
Tokai University alumni
Sportspeople from Hiroshima Prefecture
Olympic swimmers of Japan
Asian Games medalists in swimming
Swimmers at the 2010 Asian Games
Swimmers at the 2014 Asian Games
Japanese female breaststroke swimmers
Swimmers at the 2008 Summer Olympics
Swimmers at the 2016 Summer Olympics
Medalists at the 2016 Summer Olympics
Olympic gold medalists for Japan
Olympic gold medalists in swimming
Universiade medalists in swimming
Asian Games silver medalists for Japan
Medalists at the 2014 Asian Games
Universiade gold medalists for Japan
Universiade silver medalists for Japan
Medalists at the 2007 Summer Universiade
Medalists at the 2009 Summer Universiade
21st-century Japanese women